Muzaffar Khan is an Indian politician belonging to All India Trinamool Congress. He was elected as MLA of Champdani Vidhan Sabha Constituency in West Bengal Legislative Assembly in 2011.

References

Living people
Trinamool Congress politicians from West Bengal
West Bengal MLAs 2011–2016
Year of birth missing (living people)